Howardsville is an unincorporated community in southwestern Loudoun County, Virginia.

History 
In 1874, 9 years after the end of slavery, Jacob Howard and Andrew Causeberry purchased 4 acres of land in western Loudoun County on present-day Route 719 (Greengarden Road), not far from Upperville. The parcel was part of the plantation of Jacob’s former enslavers, William and Mary Stephenson. Others followed and the community of Howardsville was established. Jacob and his wife Sophia built a home, raised a family, and made a new life in freedom. Their descendants still own properties there. Howardsville remains one of the few intact African American communities in Loudoun that were formed after the Civil War.

References

African-American history of Virginia
Unincorporated communities in Loudoun County, Virginia
Unincorporated communities in Virginia
Washington metropolitan area